Ardak (also Romanized as Aradagh; also known as Engel or Ardaq) is a city and capital of Dashtabi District, in Buin Zahra County, Qazvin Province, Iran. At the 2006 census its population was 4,832, in 1,262 families. The common language in this city is Azerbaijani Turkish. Ardak is the center of kilim weaving in Qazvin province.

Qazi Ardaghi was born in Ardak.

References 

Buin Zahra County
Cities in Qazvin Province